State Road 196 (SR 196) is a short east–west thoroughfare in downtown Pensacola, Florida. It runs from Tarragona Street east to U.S. Highway 98 (Chase Street).  The portion of the road from Tarragona Street east to Alcaniz Street is known as East Main Street, and consists of two through lanes with a center left-turn lane.  East of Alcaniz Street, the road is a four-lane divided boulevard known as Bayfront Parkway.  In combination with U.S. Highway 98, SR 196 connects the south end of downtown to the Pensacola Bay Bridge.

Major intersections

References

External links
FDOT Map of Escambia County (including SR 196)

196
196
Pensacola, Florida